Sophia Antipolis is a 2,400 hectare technology park in southeast France, and as of 2021 home to 2,500 companies, valued today at more than 5.6 billion euros and employing more than 38,000 people counting more than 80 nationalities. The park is known to be Europe's first science and technology hub. The technology park is also a platform, cluster and creation-hub for start-ups.

The "technopole" houses primarily companies in the fields of computing, electronics, telecommunication, pharmacology and biotechnology. Several institutions of higher learning are also located here, along with the European headquarters of W3C, ETSI, European Society of Cardiology, etc.

The park is supported by the Sophia Antipolis Foundation, which aims to support "technological and scientific innovation and research projects at the service of mankind and our environment." The foundations honorary chairman is Pierre Laffitte and its president is Jean-Pierre Mascarelli, who is also president of SYMISA, the Sophia Antipolis Joint Association, which is "responsible for managing land, equipment, marketing and upkeeping the park and is involved with coordination activities for harmonious development of the technology park."

Naming 
Sophia Antipolis is named after Sophie Glikman-Toumarkine, the wife of French Senator Pierre Laffitte, founder of the park, and incidentally, Sophia, the Greek word for wisdom, and Antipolis, the ancient (Greek) name of a nearby seaside town Antibes. Many of the roads within the technology park have Greek names. There is a giant sculptured Greek urn as a centre-piece on one of the roundabouts.

The park is also termed a "technopole".

History 
Gérald Hanning was the consultant advisor to the DATAR for this industrial/scientific complex created 1970 to 1984.

French Senator Pierre Laffitte conceived the idea of Sophia Antipolis, calling for decentralization and "rural branch of the capital".

The year 2019 marks the 50th anniversary of the park.

Agenda 2040 
An agenda named "Sophia 2040" was created to "restore the former glory of the technology park's historic centre".

Further novel investments e. g. into intelligent vehicle technology have been initiated.

Location 
Much of the park falls within the commune of Valbonne, which lies northwest of Antibes and southwest of Nice, France.

Residential community 
Several neighborhoods within the park area exist, which make the area attractive to live: Garbejaire, Haut-Sartoux, Saint-Philippe and the Place Sophie Laffitte. The locations include typical public services such as a post office, shops, hairdressers, a primary school, sport complexes, hotels, church, children play areas, etc. The area is also surrounded by multiple golf courses and located north of the science park lies the large Regional Natural Park of the Préalpes d'Azur.

Public transport

Several bus routes (27 urban routes and 64 school bus routes) cover the vast area of the technology park. The main bus route (Ligne A, formerly known as Ligne 1), that was redesigned in 2020, connects the central bus station of the park (Gare Routière Valbonne - Sophia Antipolis) with Antibes railway station and Juan les Pins, with bus stops at main universities such as Polytech Nice Sophia and SKEMA. Antibes railway station provides access to the Riviera coastal railway (TER Provence-Alpes-Côte-d'Azur) with eastbound trains to Nice, Monaco and Ventimiglia, or westbound trains to Toulon and Marseille.

The technology park also has special express lines directly connecting the park with neighbouring cities:
 Ligne 230 (Nice - Sophia Antipolis)
 Ligne 232 (St. Laurent du Var - Sophia Antipolis)
 Ligne 530 (Grasse - Sophia Antipolis)
 Ligne 630 (Cannes - Valbonne)
 Envibus Ligne A (Antibes - Valbonne)

The nearest international airport for the general public is the Nice Côte d'Azur Airport. Passengers travelling through private jets and non-scheduled flights can use the Cannes – Mandelieu Airport as an alternative.

Academic and research institutions

 European Research Consortium for Informatics and Mathematics (ERCIM), the European home of the World Wide Web Consortium (W3C)
 European Telecommunications Standards Institute (ETSI)
 EURECOM
 INRIA, Sophia-Antipolis unit
 Institut Interdisciplinaire d’Intelligence Artificielle - 3iA
 Institut Sophia Agrobiotech - (INRAE/CNRS/UCA)
 Institut Universitaire de Technologie (IUT) Nice-Côte d'Azur - (UCA)
 Laboratoire d'Informatique, Signaux et Systèmes de Sophia Antipolis (I3S) - (CNRS/UCA)
 Mines ParisTech, École Nationale Supérieure de Mines de Paris
 Polytech Nice Sophia, polytechnic school of the University of Côte d'Azur, formerly known as University of Nice Sophia-Antipolis
 Skema Business School, School of Knowledge Economy and Management

Companies
The technology park as of 2021 lists around 2,500 companies. The park also benefits from close proximity of other large corporations in the area, e. g. Thales Alenia Space (in Cannes), IBM (La Gaude) and Schneider Electric (Carros). Furthermore, the park is near the large city of Nice and its industries.

The following list is a partial selection without claim to completeness or actuality. For an up-to-date listing and map of "park stakeholders" refer to the main website.

 3Roam
 Accenture
 Air France
 ALTEN
 Altran Praxis (software house)
 Amadeus, a travel industry IT company
 American Express Global Business Travel
 Arm Holdings
 Ashland Inc.
 Astrium GeoInformation Services
 Atos
 Avanade
 Broadcom
 Bosch
 Cadence Design Systems
 Capgemini
 CEVA France - Riviera Waves SAS
 CODIX
 Cisco
 Crossbeam Systems
 CSR plc
 Dailymotion
 Dassault Systèmes
 Dow
 Electrosmart
 Ethertronics
 Fortinet
 Funifier
 Galderma Laboratories
 Gemalto
 Hewlett-Packard
 HiPe Kids
 Hitachi Sophia-Antipolis laboratory
 Honeywell
 Huawei
 IBM
 Icera Semiconductor, now part of Nvidia
 Infineon
 Intel
 Lionbridge
 Luxottica
 Maxim Integrated
 Micromania Video Game Retailer
 MRL Technology
 Nicox
 Nvidia
 NXP Semiconductors
 Orange
 Pixeet, 360 degree software and mobile hardware solutions, International Center for Advanced Communication
 Renault Software Labs
 Rohm and Haas
 SAP AG, SAP Labs France
 Scaleo chip
 Sigma Orionis SA, the oldest spin-off company of Sophia Antipolis (founded in 1984 by researchers from Mines Paristech)
 Slice Factory
 ST Ericsson
 STMicroelectronics – STNWireless JV.
 Symphony Communication
 Tetra Engineering Europe
 Texas Instruments - SA site closed
 The Next Level
 Transas
 Triadss Tech Solutions
 Toyota ED2 - Toyota Europe Design Development studio
 TrackInsight - An exchange-traded funds analysis platform
 UDcast
 Valbonne Consulting
 Wall Street Systems
 Wipro-NewLogic - SA site closed, a former VLSI specialist design house with HQ in Austria

References

External links
 Official website
 Team Côte d’Azur - Main investment agency and body for the Riviera's ecosystem
 Sophia Antipolis Urban Community (CASA) - A property agency
 Centre International de Valbonne (CIV) - An international school

Science parks in France
Antibes
High-technology business districts in France
Buildings and structures in Alpes-Maritimes